The High Commission of Uganda in London is the diplomatic mission of Uganda in the United Kingdom. It is located in Uganda House, next to Admiralty Arch on Trafalgar Square; it shares the building with the Embassy of Burundi.

In 2011 a protest was held outside by High Commission by diaspora Ugandans opposed to the Presidency of Yoweri Museveni, and also in 2012 by people opposed to the Uganda Anti-Homosexuality Bill.

In 2012 it was revealed that two staff at the High Commission were being investigated for suspected smuggling and tax evasion.

Gallery

See also

Diplomatic missions of Uganda
High Commission of South Africa, London 
High Commission of Canada to the United Kingdom

References

External links
 Official website

Grade II listed buildings in the City of Westminster
Uganda
United Kingdom
Trafalgar Square
Uganda–United Kingdom relations
Uganda and the Commonwealth of Nations